The 1920 North Carolina gubernatorial election was held on November 2, 1920. Democratic nominee Cameron A. Morrison defeated Republican nominee John J. Parker with 57.2% of the vote. Both were attorneys in private practice at the time.

Primary elections
Only the Democratic Party held a primary election for the gubernatorial nomination at the time. Because no candidate won an absolute majority in the first round on June 5, a second primary (or "runoff") was held on July 3, 1920.

Democratic primary

Candidates
O. Max Gardner, incumbent Lieutenant Governor of North Carolina
Cameron A. Morrison, former state senator
Robert N. Page, former member of the U.S. House of Representatives

Results

General election

Candidates
Cameron Morrison, Democratic
John J. Parker, Republican
William B. Taylor, Socialist

Results

References

1920
North Carolina
Gubernatorial